Pierre Louis Félix Lanquetot (5 October 1880 in Sèvres – 26 May 1974 in Vaucresson) was a French Brigadier general.

In 1940, as defence commander of the sector of Boulogne, he was the commander in chief of the French troops during the Battle of Boulogne.

From 1940 to 1941 he was a prisoner of war. He died in Vaucresson at age 93.

References 

1880 births
1974 deaths
People from Sèvres
French military personnel of World War II
French generals
French prisoners of war in World War II
École Spéciale Militaire de Saint-Cyr alumni
Chevaliers of the Légion d'honneur
Burials at Père Lachaise Cemetery